A laissez-passer (French, literally 'let pass' or 'let it go') is a type of travel document.

Laissez-passer may also refer to:

"Laissez passer (song)", by Maître Gims, 2015
Safe Conduct (French: Laissez-passer), a 2002 French historical drama film